Bayankhongor is the capital of the Bayankhongor Province (aimag) in Mongolia. The administration of the Bayankhongor Sum (district) is also located in the same place. The city is at an elevation of 1859 m above sea level, and has a population of 26,252 (2006).

Climate
Bayankhongor experiences a cold semi-arid climate (Köppen BSk) with long, dry, very cold winters and short, warm summers.

Administration 

* city area data in referenced sources are inconsistent.

** Shargaljuut is an urban-type settlement under Bayankhongor sum jurisdiction. Shargaljuut is located 54 km NE from Bayankhongor city.

Transportation 

The Bayankhongor Airport (BVN/ZMBH) has two runways, one of them paved, and is served by regular flights to Ulaanbaatar.

References 

Districts of Bayankhongor Province
Aimag centers